The City of South Perth is a local government area in the inner southern suburbs of the Western Australian capital city of Perth about  south of Perth's central business district. The City is the entirety of the state electoral district of South Perth. An area of Kensington joined into South Perth after the 2013 redistribution, although dwindling population growth in Victoria Park may mean that part of the City will move back.

The area broadly forms a peninsula, being bounded on three sides by the waters of the Swan and Canning rivers.

History 
The South Perth Road District was formed on 9 June 1892 and the district became a municipality as the Municipality of South Perth on 21 February 1902. It then reverted to a road district on 1 March 1922, but regained municipality status on 1 March 1956. It was granted city status on 1 July 1959.

In 2014, the WA State Government mounted a proposal for local government reform; the City of South Perth was proposed to be amalgamated with the Town of Victoria Park, together with a sizable portion of the City of Canning. A poll took place during January–February 2015, with the question:  "Should the City of South Perth and the Town of Victoria Park be abolished and amalgamated to form a new local government?". The informally (non-binding) suggested name for the new entity was 'City of South Park'.

In order for the poll to prevent the amalgamation from proceeding, at least 50% of electors from either local government were required to vote, and of those, more than half needed to vote against the proposal.  At the conclusion of the poll at 6.00pm on 7 February 2015, the outcome was that for South Perth, 50.83% of the City's 26,789 electors voted, with 77.75% voting against the proposal.  Although only 38.02% of the Town of Victoria Park's 20,136 electors voted, of those, a clear majority (61.58%) voted against the proposal.  However, with more than 50% poll returns, the City of South Perth response was sufficient to cancel the amalgamation of these local governments, and they remained as separate entities.

Wards 
The City of South Perth is divided into four wards, each of whom directly elect two councillors, elected in four year cycles, in a first-past-the-post methodology. The mayor is directly elected.
 Mill Point- Ken Manolas, Mary Choy
 Moresby- Stephen Russell, Samantha Bradder
 Como- Carl Celedin, Glenn Cridland
 Manning- Blake D'Souza (deputy Mayor), Andre Brender-A-Brandis
All of these councillors are independent/unaligned. Blake D'Souza was 21 when elected in 2017.

Suburbs 
The suburbs of the City of South Perth with population and size figures based on the most recent Australian census:

The suburbs of the City of South Perth are known for being very affluent due to their proximity to the river, private schools and the CBD, all are well above the state's average. The following table contains the suburbs and their median house price, bar Karawara. House prices have dramatically increased in Como and Kensington, while being stagnant in South Perth, Manning and Salter Point, and dramatically falling in Waterford and Karawara.

Education 
The City of South Perth is home to numerous primary schools, and five major secondary schools.

Secondary 
 Aquinas College
 Como Secondary College
 Penrhos College
 Wesley College
 Clontarf Aboriginal College

Primary 
 Como Primary School
 Collier Primary School
 Curtin Primary School
 Kensington Primary School 
 Manning Primary School
 St Columba's Catholic Primary School
 Saint Pius X Primary School
 South Perth Primary School

Library 
The City of South Perth has two libraries with branches in Manning and South Perth.

The two libraries have in excess of 70,000 items over both locations. The collection contains digital and traditional items including new and popular titles across an extensive range of books, DVDs, talking books and magazines for the whole family.

A regular events program run throughout the year is designed to educate and entertain all ages.

The City of South Perth Local History Collection is a source of knowledge, ideas, stories and memories. It is developed and managed as a community resource to inspire, educate and inform the community and visitors and to contribute to the conservation of the history and heritage of the City of South Perth.

The collection provides and preserves information about the suburbs of South Perth, Como, Kensington, Manning, Karawara and Salter Point.

Picture South Perth is an online collection of historic images dating back to the 1870s that showcases the people, places and events that have shaped the City of South Perth.
It contains images from the City of South Perth's Local History Collection which have been scanned and catalogued by dedicated library staff.

Population

Heritage listed places

As of 2023, 189 places are heritage-listed in the City of South Perth, of which 20 are on the State Register of Heritage Places, among them the Old Mill, the Clontarf Aboriginal College and the Cygnet Cinema.

Notes

References 
 The History of South Perth, by F K Crowley. Rigby Limited 1962
 Peninsula City, by Cecil Florey. City of South Perth 1995

External links 
 

 
South Perth